George E. McDonald was an architect in the United States. He is credited with designing several courthouses listed on the National Register of Historic Places: 
Fillmore County Courthouse (1892) in Geneva, Nebraska

Johnson County Courthouse (Courthouse Square, Warrensburg, Missouri) (1898)
Andrew County Courthouse in Savannah, Missouri (1898)
Bates County Courthouse in Butler, Missouri (1902)
Elk County Courthouse (Howard, Kansas) (1907)

He also designed the Lawrence County Courthouse in Kansas, and the  Fillmore County Courthouse and Nuckolls County Courthouses in Nebraska, as well as a former Marion County Courthouse in Yellville, Arkansas, and the Niobrara County Courthouse (1919) in Casper, Wyoming,

Work
Marion County Courthouse (Yellville, Arkansas) (1906)
Casper City Hall (1919) in Casper, Wyoming
Dockery Building

References

Year of birth unknown
Year of death unknown
19th-century American architects
20th-century American architects